Apistoloricaria is a genus of armored catfishes native to South America.

Taxonomy
The genus name comes from the Greek apisto meaning uncertain and the Latin lorica or loricare meaning cuirass or corslet of leather. Apistoloricaria is not well diagnosed and upon further examination, may prove to be a synonym of Rhadinoloricaria.

Species 
There are currently four recognized species in this genus:
 Apistoloricaria condei Isbrücker & Nijssen, 1986
 Apistoloricaria laani Isbrücker & Nijssen, 1988
 Apistoloricaria listrorhinos Isbrücker & Nijssen, 1988
 Apistoloricaria ommation Isbrücker & Nijssen, 1988

Distribution and habitat
Representatives of this genus are distributed in the upper Amazon and Orinoco drainages, along the Atlantic slope of the Andes.

Appearance and ecology
These fish range from 10–14 centimetres (4–5.5 in) SL. In members of this genus and other closely related genera, the body is strongly depressed and the pelvic fins are used for locomotion, enabling these fish to appear to “walk” on the substrate. Sexual dimorphism is apparent through differentiated lip structure. The lip surfaces of the male are rather papillose while those of the female are filamentous.

These species are abdomino-lip brooders; eggs are laid in a single layered mass, and are attached to the surface of the lower lip and abdomen of the male.

References

Loricariini
Fish of the Amazon basin
Catfish genera
Taxa named by Isaäc J. H. Isbrücker
Taxa named by Han Nijssen
Freshwater fish genera